Laki Peak is the ice-covered peak rising to 1302 m

 in the southeast foothills of Detroit Plateau on Nordenskjöld Coast in Graham Land, Antarctica, situated between the upper courses of Eliason and Polaris Glaciers.

The peak is named after the village of Laki, Blagoevgrad Province and the town of Laki, Plovdiv Province, both in Bulgaria.

Location

Maps
 Antarctic Digital Database (ADD). Scale 1:250000 topographic map of Antarctica. Scientific Committee on Antarctic Research (SCAR). Since 1993, regularly upgraded and updated.

Notes

References
 Laki Peak. SCAR Composite Antarctic Gazetteer.
 Bulgarian Antarctic Gazetteer. Antarctic Place-names Commission. (details in Bulgarian, basic data in English)

External links
 Laki Peak. Copernix satellite image

Mountains of Graham Land
Bulgaria and the Antarctic
Nordenskjöld Coast